The Welikada Prison Massacre took place during the 1983 Black July pogrom against Sri Lankan Tamil minority in Colombo, Sri Lanka. Fifty-three prisoners were killed inside a high-security prison. No one has been convicted of crimes relating to these incidents.

Incident 
The incident occurred in two different series of actions: the first on 25 July 1983 when 35 Tamil prisoners were attacked and killed by Sinhalese inmates. The second massacre was two days later when Sinhalese inmates killed another 18 Tamil detainees and 3 prison deputies.

See also 
 Bindunuwewa prison massacre
 Kalutara prison massacre

References 

1983 in Sri Lanka
Massacres in 1983
Mass murder in Colombo
Riots and civil disorder in Sri Lanka
History of Sri Lanka (1948–present)
Prison massacres in Sri Lanka
Sri Lanka and state terrorism
July 1983 events in Asia